Good Hope Lake: Is a First Nations community in northwestern British Columbia, Canada, located on Highway 37 not far south 94 km of the Yukon border with the and located east of the semi-abandoned mining town of Cassiar and Jade City, British Columbia. As of the 2006 Census, there are 38 people living in Good Hope Lake, down from 75 in 2001.  The Dease River Band Council of the Kaska Dene Nation is located in Good Hope Lake, BC and is a member government of the Kaska Tribal Council.

See also
McDames Creek IR No.2 (Liard First Nation)

References

Unincorporated settlements in British Columbia
Cassiar Country
Kaska Dena